Basaveshwara Teaching and General Hospital, Gulbarga is a private  hospital affiliated with Mahadevappa Rampure Medical College (MRMC) in Gulbarga, Karnataka state, India. It is a renowned hospital in the name of Basaveshwara.

History
The people of Gulbarga region was rushing neighbouring states Maharashtra (Solapur), Andhra Pradesh now Telangana  (Hyderabad) cities for health care facilities.  Hyderabad Karnataka Education Society started Mahadevappa Rampure Medical College in 1963 and in 1989 Hyderabad Karnataka Education Society started Basaveshwara Teaching and General Hospital, Gulbarga.

Departments

General Medicine
General Surgery
Anesthesia.
Radiology
Pediatrics
Orthopedics
Obstetrics & Gynecology
Ophthalmology
Dermatology, Venerealogy & Leprosy
Psychiatry
Pulmonary Medicine (Chest & TB)
Pathology
Oncology
Neuro Surgery
Plastic Surgery
Urology

References

External links
 Hyderabad Karnataka Education Society health-care-medical-sciences

Teaching hospitals in India
Buildings and structures in Kalaburagi district
Hospitals established in 1990
1990 establishments in Karnataka